MTTR may refer to:

 Mean time to repair
 Mean time to recovery or mean time to restore